Hyssia is a genus of nocturnal moths of the family Noctuidae.

Species
 Hyssia adusta Draudt, 1950
 Hyssia cavernosa (Eversmann, 1842)
 Hyssia degenerans Dyar, 1914 
 Hyssia hadulina Draudt, 1950
 Hyssia pallidicosta Hampson, 1918
 Hyssia violascens Hampson, 1905

References
Natural History Museum Lepidoptera genus database
Hyssia at funet

Hadenini